Emanuele Ancorini (born 18 November 1968) is a Swedish actor, director, and former competitive figure skater. He is a two-time (1992–93) Swedish national champion. In 2008, he was a judge on Stjärnor på is, a celebrity skating show on Sweden's TV4.

Competitive highlights

References

External links

1968 births
Swedish male single skaters
Living people
People from Lidingö Municipality
Sportspeople from Stockholm County